Mathias Quéré (born 18 January 1986) is a French badminton player. In 2003, he won French National Junior Badminton Championships in mixed doubles event.

Achievements

BWF International Challenge/Series 
Men's doubles

  BWF International Challenge tournament
  BWF International Series tournament
  BWF Future Series tournament

References

External links 
 

1986 births
Living people
French male badminton players